Paul Langhoff (born 1 January 1914, date of death unknown) was a German racing cyclist. He rode in the 1938 Tour de France.

References

External links
 

1914 births
Year of death missing
German male cyclists
Place of birth missing
Sportspeople from Bielefeld
Cyclists from North Rhine-Westphalia